A Waldorf doll (also called Steiner doll) is a form of doll compatible with Waldorf (or Steiner) education philosophies.

The dolls are generally made of natural fibers — such as wool, cotton, or linen — from their stuffing to their hair to their clothing. The doll makers use techniques drawing on traditional European doll-making. The doll's appearance is intentionally simple in order to allow the child playing with it to develop the imagination and creative play. For instance, it has either no facial features, or a simple neutral expression. The legs and arms are soft and if flexible allow natural postures. They are ideally entirely natural.

Dolls vary in the form best suited to the stage of development of the child; from a simple sack or pillow doll for a baby, a knotted or handkerchief style for a teething child, a simple doll with bulky limbs and either short hair or a hat for a toddler. For an older, more independent child who can change clothing and dress hair, 'formed' limbed dolls with the ability to sit are introduced with changeable clothing and often longer hair.

Typically, hair on a Waldorf doll is made of pure wool such as mohair or boucle, ply wool or cotton. Facial feature details on a Waldorf doll vary with the maker and are generally simple stitches, sometimes painted, but are always a simple suggestion and ideally neutral, so the child can imagine the personality and mood of the doll and whether the doll is awake or asleep. Some Waldorf dolls have small suggestions of noses. Skin, eye and mouth colors vary with each doll, ideally to reflect the colouring of the child for a first doll.

See also 
 Froebel Gifts

References
 Kinder Dolls: A Waldorf Doll-Making Handbook, Maricristin Sealey, Hawthorn Press, 2001,

External links

Dolls
Alternative education
Educational toys
Stuffed toys